The DFL-Ligapokal (officially Premiere Ligapokal , previously DFB-Ligapokal ) or the German League Cup was a German football competition that took place before the start of the Bundesliga season, featuring the top five teams of the previous Bundesliga season and the winners of the DFB-Pokal in Germany. The cup was known as the Premiere-Ligapokal after 2005, when Premiere, a German pay television network, took up sponsorship of the competition. The Ligapokal was not held in 2008 due to schedule crowding caused by the UEFA Euro 2008. Instead, the German Supercup was held on 23 July. The Ligapokal was not held in 2009 either, due to the German Football Association's decision to abolish it. In the final edition of the Ligapokal in 2007, the fifth-placed Bundesliga team (Bayer Leverkusen) was dropped from the competition, replaced by the winner of the 2. Bundesliga (Karlsruhe).

Format

The Ligapokal was played between six teams, the top four teams of the Bundesliga, the DFB-Pokal winners, and the winner of the 2. Bundesliga. If a team was doubly qualified by also winning the German Cup, the number five team in the Bundesliga took the spare place.

The tournament was a knock-out competition played over three rounds with two matches in the first two rounds, and a single final in the last round. The current Bundesliga champions and the German Cup winners entered the tournament in the second round. If the Bundesliga champions were also the cup winner, the Bundesliga runner-up skipped the first round. The four remaining teams played one match to determine who qualified for the next round. The four teams in the second round then played one match to determine which teams qualified for the final. The first round matches and the final took place in neutral venues, in the semi-finals the Bundesliga champion and the Cup winner played at home. The matches lasted 90 minutes, with a penalty shootout immediately following if the match was tied.

History

The Ligapokal was played as a unique event in 1972 because the Olympics in Munich had caused a postponement of the regular season kick-off. Until 1996 there was a single match between the German champions (Deutscher Meister) and German Cup winners (Pokalsieger), which was called German Supercup and is akin to the English FA Community Shield. A competition featuring four other big clubs who had not qualified for the Supercup, the Fuji-Cup, also existed from 1986.

In 1997 this was extended to a cup competition consisting of six teams, the top five placed teams from the Bundesliga plus the German Cup winners, with the cup winners and champions entering in the semifinals. If the cup winner was the same as any of the top five finishers in the league, the 6th place team was entitled to participate and the format was adjusted accordingly.

In the 2007 edition, the participating teams were the top four teams from the Bundesliga, the German Cup winners, as well as the winners of the 2. Bundesliga.

Finals

Winners by team

Media coverage
 All five matches of the 2007 Ligapokal were broadcast live on German free-TV channel Sat.1.
 In Australia, it was broadcast by Setanta Sports.

See also
 DFB-Pokal
 DFL-Supercup
 Fuji-Cup
 Bundesliga
 LIGA total! Cup

References

External links
(West) Germany - List of Super/League Cup Finals, RSSSF.com

 
Defunct football cup competitions in Germany
Germany
Recurring sporting events established in 1997
Recurring sporting events disestablished in 2007
1997 establishments in Germany
2007 disestablishments in Germany